Joseph Cecil Maby (1902-1971) was a British biophysicist, dowser and psychical researcher.

Maby was born in the Colony of Natal and moved to England as a child. He lived near Cheltenham. He alleged that he had experienced paranormal events at his family's home. He developed a lifelong interest in psychical research.

Maby with physicist T. Bedford Franklin wrote the book The Physics of the Dowsing Rod (1939). They postulated that dowsing occurred due to some form of radiation. A review in Nature noted that there is "no direct evidence for such waves and the author's discussion of their polarization cannot be justified on our present physical knowledge." Psychologist Donovan Rawcliffe wrote that claims in the book have no scientific validity.

Maby was a Fellow of the Royal Astronomical Society. He was a member of the British Society of Dowsers and Society for Psychical Research.

Publications

Books
Walls of Jericho (1932) 
By Stygian Waters (1933) 
The Physics of the Divining Rod; being an account of an experimental investigation of water and mineral divining (1939, 1978) [with Thomas Bedford Franklin] 
Co-operative healing: the curative properties of human radiations (1947) [with Leon Ernest Eeman] 
Confessions of a Sensitive: a critical study of the paranormal and of occult faculties in man (1966) 
Physical Principles of Radiesthesia; collected papers: 1944-65 (1966) 
A Naturalist at Large: a candid commentary upon modern life and fashions (1967)

Papers
Maby, C. (1935). An Experimental Test of Astrological Claims. Journal of the British Astronomical Association 45: 165-166.
Maby, C. (1936). Micellar Structure of the Tracheide Wall in Certain Woods, in Relation to Morphogenetic and Mechanical Factors. New Phytologist 35 (5): 432-455.
Maby, C. (1940). Science and the Divining Rod. Journal of the Royal Society of Arts 88 (4559): 520-539.

References

External links
 

1902 births
1971 deaths
British physicists
Dowsing
Parapsychologists
Colony of Natal emigrants to the United Kingdom